At the time of the Roman Empire, the area of modern Croatia comprised two Roman provinces, Pannonia and Dalmatia. After the collapse of the Western Roman Empire in the 5th century, the area was subjugated by the Ostrogoths for 50 years, before being incorporated into the Byzantine Empire.

Croatia, as a polity, first appeared as a duchy in the 7th century, the Duchy of Croatia. With the nearby Principality of Lower Pannonia, it was united and elevated into the Kingdom of Croatia which lasted from 925 until 1102. From the 12th century, the Kingdom of Croatia entered a personal union with the Kingdom of Hungary. It remained a distinct state with its ruler (Ban) and Sabor, but it elected royal dynasties from neighboring powers, primarily Hungary, Naples, and the Habsburg monarchy.

The period from the 15th to the 17th centuries was marked by intense struggles between the Ottoman Empire to the south and the Habsburg Empire to the north.

Following the First World War and the dissolution of Austria-Hungary in 1918, Croatian lands were incorporated into the Kingdom of Yugoslavia, which was dominated by Serbia. Following the German invasion of Yugoslavia in April 1941, the puppet state Independent State of Croatia, allied to the Axis powers, was established. It was defeated in May 1945, after the German Instrument of Surrender. The Socialist Republic of Croatia was formed as a constituent republic of the Socialist Federal Republic of Yugoslavia. In 1991, Croatia's leadership severed ties with Yugoslavia and proclaimed independence amidst the dissolution of Yugoslavia.

Prehistoric period 

The area known today as Croatia was inhabited by hominids throughout the prehistoric period. Fossils of Neanderthals dating to the middle Palaeolithic period have been unearthed in northern Croatia, with the most famous and best-presented site in Krapina. Remnants of several Neolithic and Chalcolithic cultures have been found throughout the country. Most of the sites are in the northern Croatian river valleys, and the most significant cultures whose presence was discovered include the Starčevo, Vučedol and Baden cultures. The Iron Age left traces of the early Illyrian Hallstatt culture and the Celtic La Tène culture.

Protohistoric period 
Greek author Hecataeus of Miletus mentions that around 500 BC, the Eastern Adriatic region was settled by Histrians, Liburnians, and Illyrians. Greek colonization saw settlers establish communities on the Issa (Vis) and Pharos (Hvar) islands.

Roman expansion 

Before the Roman expansion, the eastern Adriatic coast formed the northern part of the Illyrian kingdom from the 4th century BC to the Illyrian Wars in the 220s BC. In 168 BC, the Roman Republic established its protectorate south of the Neretva river. The area north of the Neretva was slowly incorporated into Roman possession until the province of Illyricum was formally established  32–27 BC.

These lands then became part of the Roman province of Illyricum. Between 6 and 9 AD, tribes including the Dalmatae, who gave name to these lands, rose up against the Romans in the Great Illyrian revolt, but the uprising was crushed, and in 10 AD Illyricum was split into two provinces—Pannonia and Dalmatia. The province of Dalmatia spread inland to cover all of the Dinaric Alps and most of the eastern Adriatic coast. Dalmatia was the birthplace of the Roman Emperor Diocletian, who, when he retired as Emperor in 305 AD, built a large palace near Salona, from which the city of Split later developed.

Historians such as Theodore Mommsen and Bernard Bavant argue that all of Dalmatia was fully Romanized and Latin-speaking by the 4th century. Others, such as Aleksandar Stipčević, argue that the process of Romanization was selective and involved mostly the urban centers but not the countryside, where previous Illyrian socio-political structures were adapted to Roman administration and political structure only where necessary.  has argued that the Vlachs, or Morlachs, were Latin-speaking, pastoral peoples who lived in the Balkan mountains since pre-Roman times. They are mentioned in the oldest Croatian chronicles.

After the Western Roman Empire collapsed in 476, with the beginning of the Migration Period, Julius Nepos briefly ruled his diminished domain from Diocletian's Palace after his 476 flight from Italy. The region was then ruled by the Ostrogoths until 535 when Justinian I added the territory to the Byzantine Empire. Later, the Byzantines formed the Theme of Dalmatia in the same territory.

Migration period 

The Roman period ended with the Avar and Croat invasions in the 6th and 7th centuries and the destruction of almost all Roman towns. Roman survivors retreated to more favorable sites on the coast, islands, and mountains. The city of Ragusa was founded by survivors from Epidaurum. According to the work De Administrando Imperio, written by the 10th-century Byzantine Emperor Constantine VII, the Croats arrived in what is today Croatia from southern Poland and Western Ukraine in the early 7th century. However, that claim is disputed and competing hypotheses date the event between late the 6th-early 7th (mainstream) or the late 8th-early 9th (fringe) centuries. Recent archaeological data established that the migration and settlement of the Slavs/Croats occurred in the late 6th and early 7th centuries.

Duchy of Croatia (800–925) 

From the middle of the seventh century until the unification in 925, there were two duchies on the territory of today's Croatia, Duchy of Croatia and Principality of Lower Pannonia. Eventually, a dukedom was formed, the Duchy of Croatia, ruled by Borna, as attested by chronicles of Einhard starting in the year 818. The record represents the first documented Croatian realms, vassal states of Francia at the time. The most important ruler of Lower Pannonia was Ljudevit Posavski, who fought against the Franks between 819 and 823. He ruled Pannonian Croatia from 810 to 823.

The Frankish overlordship ended during the reign of Mislav two decades later. Duke Mislav was succeeded by Duke Trpimir, the founder of the Trpimirović dynasty. Trpimir successfully fought against Byzantium, Venice and Bulgaria. Duke Trpimir was succeeded by Duke Domagoj, who repeatedly led wars against the Venetians and the Byzantines, and the Venetians called this Croatian ruler "the worst Croatian prince" (dux pessimus Croatorum)  According to Constantine VII, the Christianization of Croats began in the 7th century, but the claim is disputed and generally, Christianization is associated with the 9th century. In 879, under Branimir, the duke of Croatia, Dalmatian Croatia received papal recognition as a state from Pope John VIII.

Kingdom of Croatia (925–1102)

The first king of Croatia is generally considered to have been Tomislav in the first half of the 10th century, who is mentioned as such in letters regarding Church Councils of Split, as well as in De Administrando Imperio. The latter also describes Tomislav's army driving off the Bulgarian invasion of Croatia in the 926 Battle of Bosnian Highlands.

Other important Croatian rulers from that period are:

Mihajlo Krešimir II, 949-969, who conquered Bosnia and restored the power of the Croatian kingdom,

Stjepan Držislav, 969- 997, is an ally of Byzantium in the war with the Bulgarian emperor Samuil,

Stjepan, 1030- 1058, restored the Croatian kingdom and founded the diocese in Knin.Two Croatian queens are also known from that century,  and Helen of Zadar, whose epitaph was found in the Solin area at the end of the 19th century during archeological excavations conducted by Frane Bulić.

The medieval Croatian kingdom reached its peak in the 11th century during the reigns of Petar Krešimir IV (1058–1074) and Demetrius Zvonimir (1075–1089). When Stjepan II died in 1091, ending the Trpimirović dynasty, Ladislaus I of Hungary claimed the Croatian crown on the basis of Zvonimir's wife Jelena (Helen), who was the daughter of Hungarian king Béla I. Opposition to this claim led to a war between the army loyal to Petar Sančić and the army loyal to the Hungarian king Koloman I, and after the defeat of Petar Sančić's army, a personal union of Croatia and Hungary was created in 1102, with Coloman. as ruler.

Personal union with Hungary (1102–1527) and the Republic of Venice

Croatia under the Árpád dynasty 

One consequence of entering a personal union with Hungary under the Hungarian king was the introduction of a feudal system. Later kings sought to restore some of their influence by giving certain privileges to the towns. Over the next four centuries, the Kingdom of Croatia was governed by the Sabor (parliament) and a Ban (viceroy) appointed by the king. In the year 1217, the Hungarian king Andrew II took the sign of the cross and vowed to go on the Fifth Crusade. After assembling his army, he marched from Hungary proper south to Zagreb and then Knin, after which he proceeded to Split on the Adriatic coast. The king and his party sailed to the Holy Land. Andrew's son King Béla IV had to deal with troubles brought by the first Mongol invasion of Hungary. Following the Hungarian defeat in the Battle of the Sajó River in 1241, the king withdrew to Dalmatia, hoping to take refuge there, with the Mongols in pursuit. The Mongols finally withdrew on receiving news of the death of Ögedei Khan. As Croatian historian Damir Karbić notes, during Béla's stay in Dalmatia, members of the Šubić noble family earned merit for sheltering him, so in return, the king granted them the County of Bribir, where their power reached its peak during the time of Paul I Šubić of Bribir.

This period, therefore, saw the rise of the Frankopans and the Šubićs, native nobility, to prominence. Numerous future Bans of Croatia originated from these two noble families. The princes of Bribir from the Šubić family became particularly influential, as they asserted their control over large parts of Dalmatia, Slavonia, and even Bosnia.

Croatia under the Anjou dynasty 

Lord Paul Šubić accumulated so much power, that he ruled as a de facto independent ruler. He coined his own money and held the hereditary title of Ban of Croatia. Following the death of king Ladislaus IV of Hungary, who had no male heir, a succession crisis emerged, and in 1300, Paul invited Charles Robert of Anjou to come to the Kingdom of Hungary and take over its royal seat. A civil war ensued, in which Charles' party prevailed after winning a decisive victory in the Battle of Rozgony in 1312.

Coronations of the kings of Croatia gradually fell into abeyance as a custom. Charles Robert was the last to be separately crowned as King of Croatia in 1301, after which Croatia had a separate constitution. Lord Paul Šubić died in 1312, and his son Mladen inherited the title of Ban of Croatia. Mladen's power was diminished due to the new king's policy of centralization, after he and his forces were defeated by the royal army and its allies in the Battle of Bliska in 1322. The power vacuum caused by the downfall of Mladen Šubić was used by Venice to reassert control over Dalmatian cities.

The ensuing reign of King Louis the Great (1342–1382) is considered the golden age of medieval Croatian history. Louis launched a campaign against Venice, with aim of retaking Dalmatian cities, and eventually succeeded, forcing Venice to sign the Treaty of Zadar in 1358. The same peace treaty caused the Republic of Ragusa to gain independence from Venice.

Anti-Court Movement 
Following Louis' death in 1382, the Kingdom of Hungary and parts of Croatia descended into a civil war between parties led by his daughter Mary, and her fiancé Sigismund of Luxemburg on one side, and supporters of the so-called Anti-Court Movement on another.

Ladislaus of Naples sold the entirety of Dalmatia to Venice in 1409. The period saw an increasing threat of Ottoman conquest and struggle against the Republic of Venice for control of coastal areas. The Venetians gained control over most of Dalmatia by 1428. With the exception of the city-state of Dubrovnik, which became independent, the rule of Venice over most of Dalmatia lasted nearly four centuries ( 1420–1797).

In 1490, the estates of Croatia declined to recognize Vladislaus II until he had taken an oath to respect their liberties and insisted that he strike from the constitution certain phrases which seemed to reduce Croatia to the rank of a mere province. The dispute was resolved in 1492.

Ottoman expansion 

As the Ottoman expansion into Europe started, Croatian lands became a place of permanent warfare. This period of history is considered to be one of the direst for the people living in Croatia. Baroque poet Pavao Ritter Vitezović subsequently described this period of Croatian history as "two centuries of weeping Croatia". Serious Ottoman attacks on Croatian lands began after the fall of Bosnia to the Ottomans in 1463. At this point main Ottoman attacks were not yet directed towards Central Europe, with Vienna as its main objective, but towards the Italy with Croatia standing in their way between. 

Armies of Croatian nobility fought numerous battles to counter the Ottoman akinji and martolos raids. The Ottoman forces frequently raided the Croatian countryside, plundering towns and villages, then captured the local inhabitants as slaves. These "scorched earth" tactics, also called "The Small War", were usually conducted once a year and were intended to soften up the region's defenses, but didn't result in actual conquest of territory.

The Ottoman conquest combined with famines, diseases, and a cold climate, caused vast depopulation and a refugee crisis, as people fled to safer areas. Croatian historian Ivan Jurković points out that due to the combination of these factors, Croatia "lost almost three-fifths of its population" and the compactness of its territory. As a result the center of the Croatian medieval state gradually shifted northwards into western Slavonia (Zagreb). Ottoman conquests eventually led to the 1493 Battle of Krbava field.

Croatia in the Habsburg monarchy (1527–1918)

Remnants of the remnants 

Croats fought an increasing number of battles, but lost increasing swathes of territory to the Ottoman Empire, until being reduced to what is commonly called in Croatian historiography the "Remains of the Remains of Once Glorious Croatian Kingdom" (Reliquiae reliquiarum olim inclyti regni Croatiae), or simply the "Remains of the Remains". A decisive battle between Hungarian army and the Ottomans occurred on Mohács in 1526, where Hungarian king Louis II was killed and his army was destroyed. As a consequence, in November of the same year, the Hungarian parliament elected János Szapolyai as the new king of Hungary. In December 1526, another Hungarian parliament elected Ferdinand Habsburg as King of Hungary.

The Croatian nobles met in Cetingrad in 1527 and chose Ferdinand I of the House of Habsburg as the new ruler of Croatia, on the condition that he contribute to the defense of Croatia against the Ottomans, and respect its political rights. The Diet of Slavonia, on the other hand, elected Szapolyai. A civil war between the two rival kings ensued, but later both crowns united as the Habsburgs prevailed over Szapolyai. The Ottoman Empire used these instabilities to expand in the 16th century to include most of Slavonia, western Bosnia (then called Turkish Croatia), and Lika. Those territories initially made up part of Rumelia Eyalet, and subsequently parts of Budin Eyalet, Bosnia Eyalet, and Kanije Eyalet.

Later in the same century, Croatia was so weak that its parliament authorized Ferdinand Habsburg to carve out large areas of Croatia and Slavonia adjacent to the Ottoman Empire for the creation of the Military Frontier (Vojna Krajina, German: Militaergrenze) - a buffer zone for the Ottoman Empire managed directly by the Imperial War Council in Austria. This buffer area became depopulated due to constant warfare and was subsequently settled by Serbs, Vlachs, Croats, and Germans. As a result of their compulsory military service to the Habsburg Empire during the conflict with the Ottoman Empire, the population in the Military Frontier was free of serfdom and enjoyed much political autonomy, unlike the population living in the parts managed by the Croatian Ban and Sabor, This was officially confirmed by an Imperial decree of 1630 called Statuta Valachorum (Vlach Statutes).

Hasan Pasha's Great Offensive on Croatia 
In 1590's Teli Hasan Pasha was appointed new governor of Ottoman Bosnian Eyalet. He launched his great offensive on Croatia, aimed at completely conquering Croatian "Remnants of the Remnants". In order to do that, he mobilized all available troops from his Bosnian Eyalet. Although his offensive did achieved substantial success against Croatians and their allies, such as vicories in Siege of Bihać (which Croatians never managed to retake again) or in Battle of Brest, his campaign was ultimately stopped in 1593 Battle of Sisak. Not only the Ottomans lost this battle, but Hasan Pasha got killed in the fray. This Ottoman defeat caused stabilization of a border between Croatia and the Ottoman Empire. Historian Nenad Moačanin claims that this stability of Croatian-Ottoman border was a general characteristic of a 17th century, as Ottoman Empire's might started declining.

Zrinski-Frankopan conspiracy 

During the 17th century, distinguished Croatian noble Nikola Zrinski became one of the most prominent Croatian generals in the fight against the Ottomans. In 1663/1664 he led a successful incursion into Ottoman-controlled territory. The campaign ended in the destruction of the vital Osijek bridge, which served as a connection between the Pannonian plain and the Balkan territories. As a reward for his victory against the Ottomans, Zrinski was commended by French king Louis XIV, thereby establishing contact with the French court. Croatian nobility also constructed Novi Zrin castle which sought to protect Croatia and Hungary from further Ottoman advances. At the same time, emperor Leopold of Habsburg sought to impose absolute rule on the entire Habsburg territory, which meant a loss of authority for the Croatian parliament and Ban and caused dissatisfaction with Habsburg rule among Croats.

In July 1664, a large Ottoman army besieged and destroyed Novi Zrin. As this army marched on Austrian lands, its campaign ended at the Battle of St. Gotthard, where it was destroyed by the Habsburg imperial army. Given this victory, Croatians expected a decisive Habsburg counter-offensive to push the Ottomans back and relieve pressure on Croatian lands, but Leopold decided to conclude the unfavorable Vasvar peace treaty with the Ottomans because it solved problems he had on the Rhine with the French at the time. In Croatia, his decision caused outrage among leading nobles and sparked a conspiracy to replace the Habsburgs with different rulers. After Nikola Zrinski died under unusual circumstances while hunting, his relatives Fran Krsto Frankopan and Petar Zrinski supported the conspiracy.

The conspirators established contact with the French, Venetians, Poles, and eventually even the Ottomans, only to be discovered by Habsburg spies at the Ottoman court who served as the sultan's translators. The conspirators were invited to reconcile with the emperor, to which they agreed. However, when they came to Austria, they were charged with high treason and sentenced to death. They were executed in Wiener Neustadt in April 1671. Their families, whose history was intertwined with centuries of Croatian history, were subsequently eradicated by imperial authorities, and all of their possessions were confiscated.

Great Turkish War: A revived Croatia 

Despite the decline of Ottoman might in the 17th century, the Ottoman high command decided to attack the Habsburg capital of Vienna in 1683, as the Vasvár peace treaty was about to expire. Their attack, however, ended in disaster, and the Ottomans were ultimately routed near Vienna by joint Christian armies defending the city. Soon thereafter, the Holy League was formed and the Great Turkish War was launched. In the Croatian theater of operations, several commanders distinguished themselves, including friar Luka Ibrišimović, whose rebels defeated the Ottomans in Požega, and Marko Mesić, who led the anti-Ottoman uprising in Lika. Hajduk leader Stojan Janković distinguished himself by leading troops in Dalmatia. Croatian Ban Nikola (Miklos) Erdody led his troops in battles for Virovitica, which was liberated from the Ottomans in 1684. Osijek was liberated by 1687, Kostajnica was liberated by 1688, and Slavonski Brod was liberated by 1691. A siege of Bihać was also attempted in 1687 but was called off due to lack a of cannons. In the same year, general Eugene of Savoy led a 6500-strong army from Osijek into Bosnia, where he raided the seat of Bosnia Eyalet, Sarajevo, burning it to the ground. After this raid, large groups of Christian refugees from Bosnia settled in what was then an almost empty Slavonia. After the decisive Ottoman defeat in the Battle of Zenta in 1697 by the forces of Eugene of Savoy, the Peace of Karlowitz was signed in 1699, confirming the liberation of all of Slavonia from the Ottomans. For Croatia, nonetheless, large chunks of its late medieval territories between the rivers Una and Vrbas were lost, as they remained part of the Ottoman Bosnia Eyalet. In the following years, the use of the German language spread in the new military borderland and proliferated over the next two centuries as German-speaking colonists settled in the borderlands.

Enlightened despotism

By the 18th century, the Ottoman Empire had been driven out of Hungary, and Austria brought the empire under central control. Since the emperor Charles VI had no male heirs, he wanted to leave the imperial throne to his daughter Maria Theresa of Austria, which eventually led to the War of Austrian Succession of 1741–1748. The Croatian Parliament decided to accept Maria Theresa as a legitimate ruler by drafting the Pragmatic Sanction of 1712, asking in return that whoever inherited the throne recognize and respect Croatian autonomy from Hungary. The king unwillingly granted this. The rule of Maria Theresa brought limited modernization in education and health care. Croatian Royal Council (Consilium Regni Croatiae), which served as the de facto Croatian government, was founded in Varaždin in 1767, but it was abolished in 1779 and its authority was passed to Hungary. The foundation of the Croatian Royal Council in Varaždin made this town the administrative capital of Croatia, however, a large fire in 1776 caused significant damage to the city, so these major Croatian administrative institutions moved to Zagreb.

Maria Theresa's heir, Joseph II of Austria, also ruled in an enlightened absolutist manner, but his reforms were marked by attempts at centralization and Germanization. In this period, roads were built connecting Karlovac with Rijeka, and Jozefina connecting Karlovac with Senj. With the Treaty of Sistova, which ended the Austro-Turkish War (1788-1791), the Ottoman-held areas of Donji Lapac and Cetingrad, along with the villages of Drežnik Grad and Jasenovac, were ceded to the Habsburg monarchy and incorporated into the Croatian Military Frontier.

19th century in Croatia

Napoleonic Wars 

As Napoleon's armies started to dominate Europe, Croatian lands came into contact with the French as well. When Napoleon abolished the Republic of Venice in 1797, former Venetian possessions in Dalmatia came under Habsburg rule. In 1809, as Napoleon defeated the Austrians in the Battle of Wagram, French-controlled territory eventually expanded to the Sava river. The French founded the "Illyrian Provinces" centered in Ljubljana and appointed Marshal Auguste de Marmont as their governor-general. The French presence brought the liberal ideas of the French Revolution to the Croats. The French founded Masonic lodges, built infrastructure, and printed the first newspapers in the local language in Dalmatia. Called Kraglski Datmatin/Il Regio Dalmata, it was printed in both Italian and Croatian. Croatian soldiers accompanied Napoleon in his conquests as far as Russia. In 1808, Napoleon abolished the Republic of Ragusa. Ottomans from Bosnia raided French Croatia and occupied the area of Cetingrad in 1809. Auguste de Marmont reacted by occupying Bihać on 5 May 1810. After the Ottomans promised to stop raiding French territories and withdraw from the Cetingrad, he withdrew from Bihać.

With the fall of Napoleon, the French-controlled Croatian lands came back under Austrian rule.

Croatian national revival and the Illyrian Movement 

Under the influence of German romanticism, French political thought and pan-Slavism, Croatian romantic nationalism emerged in the mid-19th century to counteract the Germanization and Magyarization of Croatia. Ljudevit Gaj emerged as a leader of the Croatian national movement. One of the important issues to be resolved was the question of language, where regional Croatian dialects had to be standardized. Since the Shtokavian dialect, widespread among Croats, was also common with Serbs, this movement likewise had a South-Slavic characteristic. At the time, "Croatian" only referred to the population in southwestern parts of what is today Croatia, while "Illyrian" was used throughout the south-Slavic world; wider masses of people were attempted to attract by using the Illyrian name. Illyrian activists chose the Shtokavian dialect over Kajkavian as the standardized version of Croatian language. The Illyrian movement was not accepted by the Serbs or the Slovenes, and it remained strictly a Croatian national movement. In 1832, Croatian count Janko Drašković wrote a manifesto of Croatian national revival called Disertacija (Dissertation). The manifesto called for the unification of Croatia with Slavonia, Dalmatia, Rijeka, the Military Frontier, Bosnia, and Slovene lands into a single unit inside the Hungarian part of the Austrian Empire. This unit would have Croatian as the official language and would be governed by Ban. The movement spread throughout Dalmatia, Istria and among Bosnian Francisian monks. It resulted in the emergence of the modern Croatian nation and eventually the formation of the first Croatian political parties. After the usage, the Illyrian name was banned in 1843; the proponents of Illyrianism changed their name to Croatian.

On 2 May 1843, Ivan Kukuljević Sakcinski held the first speech on Croatian language in the Croatian Sabor, requesting that the Croatian language be made the official language in public institutions. At this point, this was a significant step, because Latin was still in use in public institutions in Croatia. In the Sabor in 1847 Croatian was proclaimed as an official language in Croatia.

According to Croatian historian Nenad Moačanin, appearance of Romanticism also affected portion of Vlachs settled in Croatian depopulated areas who declared themselves as Serbs.

Croats in revolutions of 1848 
In the Revolutions of 1848, the Triune Kingdom of Croatia, Slavonia, and Dalmatia, driven by fear of Magyar nationalism, supported the Habsburg court against Hungarian revolutionary forces.  

During a session of the Croatian Sabor held on 25 March 1848, colonel Josip Jelačić was elected as Ban of Croatia and a petition called "Demands of The People" (Zahtjevanja naroda) was drafted to be handed over to the Austrian Emperor. These liberal demands asked for: independence, unification of Croatian lands, a Croatian government responsible to the Croatian parliament and independent from Hungary, financial independence from Hungary, the introduction of the Croatian language in offices and schools, freedom of the press, religious freedom, abolishment of serfdom, abolishment of nobility privileges, the foundation of a people's army, and equality before the law.

As the Hungarian government denied the existence of the Croatian name and nationhood and treated Croatian institutions like provincial authorities, Jelačić severed ties between Croatia and Hungary. In May 1848, Ban's Council was formed which had all the executive powers of the Croatian government. The Croatian parliament abolished feudalism, serfdom and demanded that the Monarchy become a constitutional federal state of equal nations with independent national governments and one federal parliament in the capital of Vienna. The Croatian parliament also demanded the unification of the Military Frontier and Dalmatia with Croatia proper. Sabor also asked for an undefined alliance with Istria, Slovene lands and parts of southern Hungary inhabited with Croats and Serbs. Jelačić was also appointed the governor of Rijeka and Dalmatia as well as the "Imperial Commander of Military Frontier", thus having most of the Croatian lands under his rule. The breakdown of negotiations between Croats and the Hungarians eventually led to war. Jelačić declared war on Hungary on 7 September 1848. On 11 September 1848, the Croatian army crossed the Drava river and annexed Međimurje. Upon crossing Drava, Jelačić ordered his army to switch Croatian national flags with Habsburg Imperial flags.

Despite the contributions of its Ban Josip Jelačić in quenching the Hungarian war of independence, in the aftermath, Croatia was not treated any more favorably by Vienna than the Hungarians and therefore lost its domestic autonomy.

Croatia in Dual Monarchy 

The dual monarchy of Austria-Hungary was created in 1867 through the Austro-Hungarian Compromise. Croatian autonomy was restored in 1868 with the Croatian–Hungarian Settlement, which was comparatively favorable for the Croatians, but still problematic because of issues such as the unresolved status of Rijeka.  In 1873, the territory of Military Frontier was demilitarized and in July 1871 a decision was made to incorporate it into Croatia with Croatian ban Ladislav Pejačević taking over the authority. Pejačević's successor Károly Khuen-Héderváry caused further problems by violating the Croatian-Hungarian Settlement through his hardline Magyarization policies in period from 1883 to 1903. Héderváry's magyarization of Croatia led to massive riots in 1903, when Croatian protesters burnt Hungarian flags and clashed with the gendarmes and the military, resulting in the death of several protesters. As a consequence of these riots, Héderváry left his position as Ban of Croatia, but was appointed prime minister of Hungary.

A year earlier, in 1902, Srbobran, the newspaper of Zagreb Serbs, published an article titled "Do istrage naše ili vaše" (Until us, or you get exterminated). The article was filled with Greater Serbian ideology; its text denied the existence of the Croatian nation and the Croatian language and announced Serbian victory over "servile Croats", who would, the article proclaimed, be exterminated.

The article sparked major anti-Serb riots in Zagreb, in which barricades were raised and Serb-owned properties were attacked. Serbs of Zagreb eventually distanced themselves from the opinions published in the article.

World War I brought an end to the Dual Monarchy. Croatia suffered a great loss of life in World War I. Late in the war, there were proposals to transform the dualist monarchy into a federalist one, with a separate Croatian/South Slavic section, however, these plans were never carried out, due to Woodrow Wilson's announcement of a policy of self-determination for peoples of Austria-Hungary.

Shortly before the end of the war in 1918, the Croatian Parliament severed relations with Austria-Hungary after receiving the news that the Czechoslovak parts had also separated from Austria-Hungary. The Triune Kingdom of Croatia, Slavonia, and Dalmatia became a part of the newly created provisional State of Slovenes, Croats and Serbs. This internationally unrecognized state was composed of all of the South Slavic territories of the old Austro-Hungarian Monarchy with a transitional government located in Zagreb. Its biggest issue, however, was the advancing Italian army that sought to capture the Croatian Adriatic territories promised to them by the Treaty of London in 1915. A solution was sought through unification with the Kingdom of Serbia, which had an army capable of confronting the Italians as well as the international legitimacy among the members of the Entente Cordiale, which was about to carve new European borders at the Paris Peace Conference.

Croats inside the first Yugoslavia (1918–1941) 

A new state was created in late 1918. Srijem left Croatia-Slavonia and joined Serbia together with Vojvodina, shortly followed by a referendum to join Bosnia and Herzegovina to Serbia. The People's Council of Slovenes, Croats and Serbs (Narodno vijeće), guided by what was by that time a half-century-long tradition of pan-Slavism and without the sanction of the Croatian Sabor, merged with the Kingdom of Serbia into the Kingdom of the Serbs, Croats and Slovenes.

An Italian army eventually took Istria, started to annex the Adriatic islands one by one, and even landed in Zadar. A partial resolution to the so-called Adriatic Question came in 1920 with the Treaty of Rapallo.

The Kingdom underwent a crucial change in 1921 to the dismay of Croatia's largest political party, the Croatian Peasant Party (Hrvatska seljačka stranka). The new constitution abolished historical/political entities, including Croatia and Slavonia, centralizing authority in the capital of Belgrade. The Croatian Peasant Party boycotted the government of the Serbian People's Radical Party throughout the period, except for a brief interlude between 1925 and 1927, when external Italian expansionism was at hand with her allies, Albania, Hungary, Romania, and Bulgaria, threatening Yugoslavia as a whole. Two differing concepts of how the new common state should be governed became the main source of conflict between Croatian elites led by the Croatian Peasant Party and Serbian elites. Leading Croatian politicians sought a federalized new state in which Croats would have certain autonomy (similar to what they had before in Austria-Hungary), while Serb-centered parties advocated unitarist policies, centralization, and assimilation. The new country's military was also a predominately Serbian institution; by 1938 only about 10% of all Army officers were Croats. The new school system was Serb-centered with Croatian teachers being either retired, purged, or transferred. Serbs were also posted as high state officials. The replacement of old Austro-Hungarian Krones was conducted through an unfair rate of four Krones for one Serbian Dinar.

In the early 1920s, the Yugoslav government of Serbian prime minister Nikola Pašić used police pressure on voters and ethnic minorities, confiscation of opposition pamphlets, and election-rigging to keep the opposition, mainly the Croatian Peasant Party and its allies, in the minority in the Yugoslav parliament. Pašić believed that Yugoslavia should be as centralized as possible, creating a Greater Serbian national concept of concentrated power in the hands of Belgrade in place of distinct regional governments and identities.

Murders of 1928 and royal dictatorship 
During a Parliament session in 1928, Puniša Račić, a deputy of the Serbian Radical People's Party, shot at Croatian deputies, resulting in the killing of Pavle Radić and Đuro Basariček and the wounding of Ivan Pernar and Ivan Granđa. Stjepan Radić, a Croatian political champion at the time, was wounded and later succumbed to his wounds. These multiple murders caused the outrage of the Croatian population and ignited violent demonstrations, strikes, and armed conflicts throughout Croatian parts of the country. The Greater Serbian-influenced Royal Yugoslav Court even considered "amputation" of Croatian parts of the country, while leaving Yugoslavia only inside Greater Serbian borders, however, Croatian Peasant Party leadership rejected this idea. While Račić was subsequently tried for multiple murders, he served his sentence in a luxurious villa in Požarevac, where he had several servants at his disposal and was allowed to leave and return at any time.

In response to the shooting at the National Assembly, King Aleksandar abolished the parliamentary system and proclaimed personal dictatorship. He imposed a new constitution aimed at removing all existing national identities and imposing "integral Yugoslavism". He also renamed the country from the Kingdom of Serbs, Croats and Slovenes to the Kingdom of Yugoslavia. The territory of Croatia was largely divided into the territories of the Sava and Littoral Banates. Political parties were banned and the royal dictatorship took on an increasingly harsh character. Vladko Maček, who had succeeded Radić as leader of the Croatian Peasant Party, the largest political party in Croatia, was imprisoned. This new situation inspired Ante Pavelić to leave Yugoslavia and create the Ustaše Movement, with the ultimate goal of destroying Yugoslavia and making Croatia an independent country. According to the British historian Misha Glenny, the murder in March 1929 of Toni Schlegel, editor of the pro-Yugoslavian newspaper Novosti, brought a "furious response" from the regime. In Lika and west Herzegovina in particular, described as "hotbeds of Croatian separatism", Glenny wrote that the majority-Serb police acted "with no restraining authority whatsoever". In the words of a prominent Croatian writer, Schlegel's death became the pretext for terror in all forms. Politics was soon "indistinguishable from gangsterism". In 1931, the royal regime organized the assassination of Croatian scientist and intellectual Milan Šufflay on the streets of Zagreb. The assassination was condemned by globally renowned intellectuals such as Albert Einstein and Heinrich Mann. In 1932, the Ustaše Movement made an unsuccessful attempt to spark the Velebit uprising in Lika. Despite the oppressive climate, few rallied to the Ustaša cause and the movement was never able to gain serious support among the Croatian population.

Banovina of Croatia 
In 1934, King Aleksandar was assassinated during a state visit to Marseille by a coalition of the Ustaše and the Bulgarian Internal Macedonian Revolutionary Organization (IMRO), thus ending the Royal dictatorship. The government of Serbian Radical Milan Stojadinović, which took power in 1935, distanced Yugoslavia from its former allies of France and the United Kingdom and moved the country closer to Fascist Italy and Nazi Germany. In 1937 Yugoslav gendarmes led by Radical Party member Jovo Koprivica killed dozen of youth members of the Croatian Peasant Party in Senj, because they sang Croatian patriotic songs. With the rise of Nazis in Germany and the looming possibility of another European war, Serbian political elites decided that it was time to fix relations with the Croats, the second largest ethnic group in the country, so that in the event of a new war the country would be united and without ethnic divisions. Negotiations started, resulting in the Cvetković–Maček Agreement and the creation of Banovina of Croatia, an autonomous Croatian province inside Yugoslavia. Banovina of Croatia was created in 1939 out of the two Banates, as well as parts of the Zeta, Vrbas, Drina, and Danube Banates. It had a reconstructed Croatian Parliament which would choose a Croatian Ban and Viceban. This Croatia included a part of Bosnia, most of Herzegovina, and the city of Dubrovnik and the surroundings.

World War II and the Independent State of Croatia (1941–1945)

The Axis occupation of Yugoslavia in 1941 allowed the Croatian radical right Ustaše to come into power, forming the "Independent State of Croatia" (Nezavisna Država Hrvatska, NDH), led by Ante Pavelić, who assumed the role of Poglavnik. Following the pattern of other fascist regimes in Europe, the Ustaše enacted racial laws and formed eight concentration camps targeting minority Serbs, Romas, and Jewish populations, as well as Croatian and Bosnian Muslim opponents of the regime. The biggest concentration camp was Jasenovac in Croatia. The NDH had a program, formulated by Mile Budak, to purge Croatia of Serbs, by "killing one third, expelling the other third and assimilating the remaining third". The main targets for persecution were the Serbs, of whom approximately 330,000 were killed.

Various Serbian nationalist Chetnik groups also committed atrocities against Croats across many areas of Lika and parts of northern Dalmatia. During World War II in Yugoslavia, the Chetniks killed an estimated 18,000-32,000 Croats.

The anti-fascist communist-led Partisan movement, based on a pan-Yugoslav ideology, emerged in early 1941 under the command of Croatian-born Josip Broz Tito, and spread quickly into many parts of Yugoslavia. The 1st Sisak Partisan Detachment, often hailed as the first armed anti-fascist resistance unit in occupied Europe, was formed in Croatia, in the Brezovica Forest near the town of Sisak. As the movement began to gain popularity, the Partisans gained strength from Croats, Bosniaks, Serbs, Slovenes, and Macedonians who believed in a unified, but federal, Yugoslav state.

By 1943, the Partisan resistance movement had gained the upper hand and in 1945, with help from the Soviet Red Army (passing only through small parts such as Vojvodina), expelled the Axis forces and local supporters. The State Anti-Fascist Council for the National Liberation of Croatia (ZAVNOH) functioned since 1942 and formed an interim civil government by 1943. NDH's ministers of War and Internal Security Mladen Lorković and Ante Vokić tried to switch to the Allied side. Pavelić was, in the beginning, supporting them but when he found that he would need to leave his position he imprisoned them in Lepoglava prison where they were executed.

Following the defeat of the Independent State of Croatia at the end of the war, a large number of Ustaše, civilians supporting them (ranging from sympathizers, young conscripts, anti-communists, and ordinary serfs who were motivated by Partisan atrocities), Chetniks and anti-Communists attempted to flee in the direction of Austria, hoping to surrender to British forces and to be given refuge. Following the Bleiburg repatriations, they were instead interned by British forces, and returned to the Partisans where they were subject to mass executions.

Socialist Yugoslavia (1945–1991)

Tito's leadership of the LCY (1945–1980)

Croatia was one of six constituent socialist republics of the Socialist Federative Republic of Yugoslavia. Under the new communist system, privately-owned factories and estates were nationalized, and the economy was based on a type of planned market socialism. The country underwent a rebuilding process, recovered from World War II, went through industrialization, and started developing tourism.

The country's socialist system also provided free apartments from large companies, which with the workers' self-management investments paid for the living spaces. From 1963, the citizens of Yugoslavia were allowed to travel to almost any country because of the neutral politics. No visas were required to travel to eastern or western countries or capitalist or communist nations. Such free travel was unheard of at the time in the Eastern Bloc countries, and in some western countries as well (e.g., Spain or Portugal, both dictatorships at the time). This proved to be helpful for Croatia's inhabitants who found working in foreign countries more financially rewarding. Upon retirement, a popular plan was to return to live in Croatia (then Yugoslavia) to buy more expensive property.

In Yugoslavia, the people of Croatia were guaranteed free healthcare, free dental care, and secure pensions. The older generation found this very comforting as pensions would sometimes exceed their former paychecks. Free trade and travel within the country also helped Croatian industries that imported and exported throughout all the former republics.

Students and military personnel were encouraged to visit other republics to learn more about the country, and all levels of education, including secondary education and higher education, were free. In reality, the housing was inferior with poor heat and plumbing, the medical care often lacking even in the availability of antibiotics, schools were propaganda machines and travel was a necessity to provide the country with hard currency. The propagandists, who want people to believe "neutral policies" equalized Serbs and Croats, severely restricted free speech and did not protect citizens from ethnic attacks.

Membership in the League of Communists of Yugoslavia was as much a prerequisite for admission to colleges and government jobs as in the Soviet Union under Joseph Stalin or Nikita Khrushchev. Private sector businesses did not grow as the taxes on private enterprise were often prohibitive. Inexperienced management sometimes ruled policy and controlled decisions by brute force. Strikes were forbidden, and owners/managers were not permitted to make changes or decisions which would impact their productivity or profit.

The economy developed into a type of socialism called samoupravljanje (self-management), in which workers controlled socially-owned enterprises. This kind of market socialism created significantly better economic conditions than in the Eastern Bloc countries. Croatia went through intensive industrialization in the 1960s and 1970s with industrial output increasing several-fold and with Zagreb surpassing Belgrade in industry. Factories and other organizations were often named after Partisans who were declared national heroes. This practice also spread to street names, as well as the names of parks and buildings.

Before World War II, Croatia's industry was not developed, with the vast majority of the people employed in agriculture. By 1991, the country was completely transformed into a modern industrialized state. At the same time, the Croatian Adriatic coast had become a popular tourist destination, and the coastal republics (but mostly SR Croatia) profited greatly from this, as tourist numbers reached levels still unsurpassed in modern Croatia. The government brought unprecedented economic and industrial growth, high levels of social security, and a very low crime rate. The country completely recovered from WWII and achieved a very high GDP and economic growth rate, significantly higher than those of the present-day republic.

The constitution of 1963 balanced power in the country between the Croats and the Serbs and alleviated the imbalance coming from the fact that the Croats were again in a minority position. Trends after 1965 (like the fall of OZNA and UDBA chief Aleksandar Ranković from power in 1966), however, led to the Croatian Spring of 1970–71, when students in Zagreb organized demonstrations to achieve greater civil liberties and greater Croatian autonomy. The regime stifled public protest and incarcerated the leaders, but this led to the ratification of a new constitution in 1974, giving more rights to the individual republics.

Radical Ustaše cells of Croatian émigrés based in Australia and Western Europe planned and attempted to carry out acts of sabotage within Yugoslavia, including an incursion from Austria of 19 armed men in June 1971, who unsuccessfully aimed to incite a popular Croatian uprising against what they called the "Serbo-communist" regime in Belgrade.

Until the breakup of Yugoslavia (1980–1991)

In 1980, after Tito's death, economic, political, and religious difficulties started to mount and the federal government began to crumble. The crisis in Kosovo and, in 1986, the emergence of Slobodan Milošević in Serbia provoked a very negative reaction in Croatia and Slovenia; politicians from both republics feared that his motives would threaten their republics' autonomy. With the climate of change throughout Eastern Europe during the 1980s, the communist hegemony was challenged (at the same time, the Milošević government began to gradually concentrate Yugoslav power in Serbia, and calls for free multi-party elections were becoming louder).

In June 1989, the Croatian Democratic Union (HDZ) was founded by Croatian nationalist dissidents led by Franjo Tuđman, a former fighter in Tito's Partisan movement and a JNA General. At this time, Yugoslavia was still a one-party state and open manifestations of Croatian nationalism were considered dangerous, so a new party was founded in an almost conspiratorial manner. It was only on 13 December 1989 that the governing League of Communists of Croatia agreed to legalize opposition political parties and hold free elections in the spring of 1990.

On 23 January 1990, at its 14th Congress, the Communist League of Yugoslavia voted to remove its monopoly on political power. The same day, it effectively ceased to exist as a national party when the League of Communists of Slovenia walked out after SR Serbia's President Slobodan Milošević blocked all their reformist proposals, which caused the League of Communists of Croatia to further distance themselves from the idea of a joint state.

Republic of Croatia (1991–present)

Introduction of multi-party political system

On 22 April and 7 May 1990, the first free multi-party elections were held in Croatia. Franjo Tuđman's Croatian Democratic Union (HDZ) won by a 42% margin against Ivica Račan's reformed communist Party of Democratic Change (SDP) who won 26%. Croatia's first-past-the-post election system enabled Tuđman to form the government relatively independently, as the win translated into 205 mandates (out of 351 total). The HDZ intended to secure independence for Croatia, contrary to the wishes of some ethnic Serbs in the republic and federal politicians in Belgrade. The excessively polarized climate soon escalated into complete estrangement between the two nations and spiraled into sectarian violence.

On 25 July 1990, a Serbian Assembly was established in Srb, north of Knin, as the political representation of the Serbian people in Croatia. The Serbian Assembly declared "sovereignty and autonomy of the Serb people in Croatia". Their position was that if Croatia could secede from Yugoslavia, then the Serbs could secede from Croatia. Milan Babić, a dentist from the southern town of Knin, was elected president. The rebel Croatian Serbs established some paramilitary militias under the leadership of Milan Martić, the police chief in Knin.

On 17 August 1990, the Serbs of Croatia began what became known as the Log Revolution, where barricades of logs were placed across roads throughout the South as an expression of their secession from Croatia. This effectively cut Croatia in two, separating the coastal region of Dalmatia from the rest of the country. The Croatian government responded to the road blockades by sending special police teams in helicopters to the scene, but they were intercepted by SFR Yugoslav Air Force fighter jets and forced to turn back to Zagreb.

The Croatian constitution was passed in December 1990, categorizing Serbs as a minority group along with other ethnic groups. On 21 December 1990, Babić's administration announced the creation of a Serbian Autonomous Oblast of Krajina (or SAO Krajina). Other Serb-dominated communities in eastern Croatia announced that they would also join SAO Krajina and ceased paying taxes to the Zagreb government.

On Easter Sunday, 31 March 1991, the first fatal clashes occurred when police from the Croatian Ministry of the Interior (MUP) entered the Plitvice Lakes National Park to expel rebel Serb forces. Serb paramilitaries ambushed a bus carrying Croatian police into the national park on the road north of Korenica, sparking a day-long gun battle between the two sides. During the fighting, one Croat and one Serb policeman were killed. Twenty other people were injured and twenty-nine Krajina Serb paramilitaries and policemen were taken prisoner by Croatian forces. Among the prisoners was Goran Hadžić, who would later become the President of the Republic of Serbian Krajina.

On 2 May 1991, the Croatian parliament voted to hold an independence referendum. On 19 May 1991, with a turnout of almost 80%, 93.24% voted for independence. Krajina boycotted the referendum. They had held their referendum a week earlier on 12 May 1991 in the territories they controlled and voted to remain in Yugoslavia. The Croatian government did not recognize their referendum as valid.

On 25 June 1991, the Croatian Parliament declared independence from Yugoslavia. Slovenia declared independence from Yugoslavia on the same day.

War of Independence (1991–1995)

During the Croatian War of Independence, the civilian population fled the areas of armed conflict en masse, with hundreds of thousands of Croats moving away from the Bosnian and Serbian border areas. In many places, masses of civilians were forced out by the Yugoslav National Army (JNA), which consisted mostly of conscripts from Serbia and Montenegro, and irregulars from Serbia, participating in what became known as ethnic cleansing.

The border city of Vukovar underwent a three-month siege during the Battle of Vukovar. It left most of the city destroyed and a majority of the population was forced to flee. The city was taken over by the Serbian forces on 18 November 1991 and the Vukovar massacre occurred.

Subsequent United Nations-sponsored cease fires followed, and the warring parties were mostly entrenched. The Yugoslav People's Army retreated from Croatia into Bosnia and Herzegovina where a new cycle of tensions was escalating—the Bosnian War was about to start. During 1992 and 1993, Croatia also handled an estimated 700,000 refugees from Bosnia, mainly Bosnian Muslims.

Armed conflict in Croatia remained intermittent and mostly small-scale until 1995. In early August, Croatia embarked on Operation Storm, an attack that quickly reconquered most of the territories from the Republic of Serbian Krajina authorities, leading to a mass exodus of the Serbian population. Estimates of the number of Serbs who fled before, during and after the operation range from 90,000 to 200,000.

As a result of this operation, a few months later the Bosnian War ended with the negotiation of the Dayton Agreement. A peaceful integration of the remaining Serbian-controlled territories in eastern Slavonia was completed in 1998 under UN supervision. The majority of the Serbs who fled from former Krajina did not return due to fears of ethnic violence, discrimination, and property repossession problems; and the Croatian government has yet to achieve the conditions for full reintegration. According to the United Nations High Commissioner for Refugees, around 125,000 ethnic Serbs who fled the 1991–1995 conflict are registered as having returned to Croatia, of whom around 55,000 remain permanently.

Since the end of the war

Croatia became a member of the Council of Europe in 1996. While the years 1996 and 1997 were a period of post-war recovery and improving economic conditions, in 1998 and 1999 Croatia experienced an economic depression resulting in the unemployment of thousands.

The remainder of former Krajina, adjacent to the FR Yugoslavia, negotiated a peaceful reintegration process with the Croatian government. The so-called Erdut Agreement made the area a temporary protectorate of the UN Transitional Administration for Eastern Slavonia, Baranja and Western Sirmium. The area was formally re-integrated into Croatia by 1998.

Franjo Tuđman's government started to lose popularity as it was criticized for its involvement in suspicious privatization deals in the early 1990s, as well as for international isolation. The country experienced a mild recession in 1998 and 1999.

Tuđman died in 1999 and in the early 2000 parliamentary elections, the nationalist Croatian Democratic Union (HDZ) government was replaced by a center-left coalition under the Social Democratic Party of Croatia, with Ivica Račan as prime minister. At the same time, presidential elections were held which were won by a moderate, Stjepan Mesić. The new Račan government amended the constitution, changing the political system from a presidential system to a parliamentary system, transferring most executive presidential powers from the president to the institutions of the parliament and the prime minister.

The new government also started several large building projects, including state-sponsored housing, more rebuilding efforts to enable refugee return, and the building of the A1 highway. The country achieved notable economic growth during these years, while the unemployment rate continued to rise until 2001 when it finally started falling. Croatia became a World Trade Organization (WTO) member in 2000 and started the Accession of Croatia to the European Union in 2003.

In late 2003, new parliamentary elections were held and a reformed HDZ party won under the leadership of Ivo Sanader, who became prime minister. European accession was delayed by controversies over the extradition of army generals to the International Criminal Tribunal for the former Yugoslavia (ICTY), including the runaway Ante Gotovina.

Sanader was reelected in the closely contested 2007 parliamentary election. Other complications continued to stall the EU negotiating process, most notably Slovenia's blockade of Croatia's EU accession in 2008–2009. In June 2009, Sanader abruptly resigned from his post and named Jadranka Kosor in his place. Kosor introduced austerity measures to counter the economic crisis and launched an anti-corruption campaign aimed at public officials. In late 2009, Kosor signed an agreement with Borut Pahor, the premier of Slovenia, that allowed the EU accession to proceed.

In the Croatian presidential election, 2009–2010, Ivo Josipović, the candidate of the SDP won a landslide victory.
Sanader tried to come back into HDZ in 2010 but was then ejected, and USKOK soon had him arrested on several corruption charges.

In November 2012, a court in Croatia sentenced former Prime Minister Ivo Sanader, in office from 2003 to 2009, to 10 years in prison for taking bribes. Sanader tried to argue that the case against him was politically motivated.

In 2011, the accession agreement was concluded, giving Croatia the all-clear to join.

The 2011 Croatian parliamentary election was held on 4 December 2011, and the Kukuriku coalition won. After the election, the center-left government was formed led by new prime minister Zoran Milanović.

Following the ratification of the Treaty of Accession 2011 and the successful 2012 Croatian European Union membership referendum, Croatia joined the EU on 1 July 2013.

In the 2014–15 Croatian presidential election, Kolinda Grabar-Kitarović became the first Croatian female President.

The 2015 Croatian parliamentary election resulted in the victory of the Patriotic Coalition which formed a new government with the Bridge of Independent Lists. However, a vote of no confidence brought down the Cabinet of Tihomir Orešković. After the 2016 Croatian parliamentary election, the Cabinet of Andrej Plenković was formed.

In January 2020, the former prime minister Zoran Milanović of the Social Democrats (SDP) won the presidential election. He defeated center-right incumbent Kolinda Grabar-Kitarović of the ruling Croatian Democratic Union (HDZ). In March 2020, the Croatian capital Zagreb experienced a 5.3 magnitude earthquake which caused significant damage to the city. In July 2020, the ruling center-right party HDZ won the parliamentary election. On 12 October 2020 right-wing extremist Danijel Bezuk attempted an attack on the building of the Croatian government, wounded a police officer in the process, and then killed himself. In December 2020. Banovina, one of the less developed regions of Croatia was shaken by a 6.4 M earthquake which killed several people and destroyed the town of Petrinja. Throughout two and half years of the global COVID-19 pandemic, 16,103 Croatian citizens died from the disease. In March 2022, a Soviet-made Tu-141 drone crashed in Zagreb, most likely due to the 2022 Russian invasion of Ukraine. On 26 July 2022, Croatian authorities opened Pelješac Bridge, thus connecting the southernmost part of Croatia with the rest of the country. On 1 January 2023 Croatia became a member of both the Eurozone and Schengen Area.

See also

 Bans of Croatia
 Croatian art
 Croatian History Museum
 Croatian Military Frontier
 Croatian nobility
 Culture of Croatia
 History of Dalmatia
 History of Hungary
 History of Istria
 Hundred Years' Croatian–Ottoman War
 Kingdom of Dalmatia
 Kingdom of Slavonia
 Kings of Croatia
 List of noble families of Croatia
 List of rulers of Croatia
 Military history of Croatia
 Timeline of Croatian history
 Turkish Croatia
 Twelve noble tribes of Croatia

References

Bibliography

 Patterson, Patrick Hyder. "The futile crescent? Judging the legacies of Ottoman rule in Croatian history". Austrian History Yearbook, vol. 40, 2009, p. 125+. online.

External links

Croatian Institute of History
Museum Documentation Center
The Croatian History Museum
Journal of Croatian Studies
Short History of Croatia
Overview of History, Culture, and Science
History of Croatia: Primary Documents
Overview of History, Culture and Science of Croatia
WWW-VL History:Croatia
Dr. Michael McAdams: Croatia – Myth and Reality
Historical Maps of Croatia
Croatia under Tomislav -from Nada Klaic book
The History Files: Croatia
A brief history of Croatia
The Early History of Croatia
Croatia since Independence 1990-2018